Ayumi Hamasaki's Dome Live Tour 2001 A DVD was released on December 12, 2001.

Track listing
 evolution
 Fly high
 Duty
 NEVER EVER
 M
 A Song for XX
 SURREAL
 vogue
 AUDIENCE
 SEASONS
 Endless sorrow

---ENCORE---
 UNITE!
 Trauma
 Boys & Girls
 Who…

Tour dates

References

Ayumi Hamasaki video albums
2001 video albums
Live video albums
2001 live albums
Albums recorded at the Tokyo Dome